The first Berlusconi government was the 51st government of the Italian Republic.

It was the first right-wing and non-Christian Democrats government since World War II.

Berlusconi resigned on 22 December 1994.

History
In order to win the March 1994 general election Berlusconi formed two electoral alliances: Pole of Freedoms with the Northern League in northern Italian districts, and another, the Pole of Good Government, with the post-fascist National Alliance (heir to the Italian Social Movement) in central and southern regions. He did not ally with the latter in the North because the League disliked them. As a result, Forza Italia was allied with two parties that were not allied with each other.

Berlusconi launched a massive campaign of electoral advertisements on his three TV networks. He subsequently won the elections, with Forza Italia garnering 21% of the popular vote, the highest percentage of any single party. One of the most significant promises that he made in order to secure victory was that his government would create "one million more jobs". He was appointed Prime Minister in 1994, but his term in office was short because of the inherent contradictions in his coalition: the League, a regional party with a strong electoral base in northern Italy, was at that time fluctuating between federalist and separatist positions, and National Alliance was a nationalist party that had yet to renounce neo-fascism at the time.
In December 1994, following the communication of a new investigation from Milan magistrates that was leaked to the press, Umberto Bossi, leader of the Northern League, left the coalition claiming that the electoral pact had not been respected, forcing Berlusconi to resign from office and shifting the majority's weight to the centre-left side. The Northern League also resented the fact that many of its MPs had switched to Forza Italia, allegedly lured by promises of more prestigious portfolios. In 1998 various articles attacking Berlusconi were published by Northern League's official newspaper (La Padania), with titles such as ""Fininvest (Berlusconi's principal company) was founded by Cosa Nostra".

Berlusconi remained prime minister for a little over a month until his replacement by a technocratic government headed by Lamberto Dini. Dini had been a key minister in the Berlusconi government, and Berlusconi said the only way he would support a technocratic government would be if Dini headed it. In the end, however, Dini was only supported by most opposition parties but not by Forza Italia.

Investiture vote

Party breakdown
 Forza Italia (FI): Prime minister, 8 ministers and 12 undersecretaries
 National Alliance (AN): 5 ministers and 12 undersecretaries
 Northern League (LN): 5 ministers and 9 undersecretaries
 Christian Democratic Centre (CCD): 2 ministers and 1 undersecretary
 Union of the Centre (UdC): 2 ministers
 Liberal Democratic Foundation (FLD): 1 minister and 1 undersecretary
 Independents: 2 ministers and 1 undersecretary

Composition

References

Italian Government – Berlusconi I Cabinet

Italian governments
Silvio Berlusconi
1994 establishments in Italy
1995 disestablishments in Italy
Cabinets established in 1994
Cabinets disestablished in 1995